Muyu may refer to:

Muyu people, an indigenous ethnic group of Western New Guinea
Muyu language
Wooden fish, an Asian percussion instrument usually associated with Buddhist monks
Muyu, Hubei, a town of Shennongjia, Hubei, China
Muyu, Sichuan, a town of Qingchuan County, Sichuan, China
Be a Mother, 2011 Chinese film

See also
Muyu Muyu, archaeological complex in Peru

Language and nationality disambiguation pages